Philoxenus is a genus of clown beetles in the family Histeridae. There is one described species in Philoxenus, Philoxenus desertorum.

References

Further reading

 
 

Histeridae